Cheriyan Joseph, popularly known as Prem Prakash is an Indian actor who predominantly works in Malayalam television serials and a renowned producer in Malayalam movies. He is mainly known for supporting roles and character roles. He has produced 19 Malayalam films. He is known as Kariachan amongst his family, friends and cinema circles.

Personal life 

Prem Prakash was born as the youngest among eight children to K. J. Joseph and Eliyamma Joseph at Kochi, Kerala. He spend his childhood in Shikohabad Uttar Pradesh. He has four brothers and three sisters, the eldest brother being the veteran actor Jose Prakash, who was 19 years older than him. He did his schooling in Sacred Heart Mount School Kottayam & St.Epherms School Mannanam. He completed his higher education in C.M.S.College Kottayam & S.B.College Changanacherry. He is married to Daisy Luke who is a retired English professor from BCM College Kottayam. They have a daughter Thankam & two sons, Malayalam movie screenwriter duo Bobby–Sanjay. Prem Prakash also produced and acted in few notable TV serials. His first love had been singing and he entered the film industry as a playback singer in the 1968 film Kaarthika.

Career 

He was educated in SB College Changanassery and CMS College Kottayam. Premprakash made his acting debut in the movie Ara Nazhika Neram in 1970. He produced his first film Peruvazhiyambalam in 1979. It was the film that really launched the career of writer-director P. Padmarajan and also introduced actor Ashokan for the first time. That film was well-received and he went on to make 17 more films, of which films like Koodevide, Akashadoothu, Johnnie Walker, Ente Veedu Appuvinteyum and Ayalum Njanum Thammil firmly established him as a successful producer. He won the Best Character Actor Award in the 2015 Kerala State Film Awards for his role in Nirnayakam. He is also credited with introducing popular actors Rashin Rahman, Biju Menon, N F Varghese, Jyothirmayi, Achankunju, lyricist Gireesh Puthenchery, music director A J Joseph and director Jude Attipetty. He served as a juror for the 61st South Indian Film Fare Awards, announced in July 2014.  His autobiography, Prakashavarshangal, is published by D C Books.

Awards 
National Film Awards
 1979 Rajat Kamal Award for Best Malayalam Feature Film – Peruvazhiyambalam
Kerala State Film Awards
 1979 Kerala State Film Award for Second Best Film – Peruvazhiyambalam
 1983 Kerala State Film Award for Best Popular Film – Koodevide
 2003 Kerala State Film Award for Best Popular Film – Ente Veedu Appuvinteyum
 2012 Kerala State Film Award for Best Popular Film – Ayalum Njanum Thammil
 2015 Kerala State Film Award for Best Character Actor – Nirnayakam
Film Producer's Association Award
 2015 Best Character Actor – Nirnayakam
Film Critics Award
 2015 2nd Best Actor – Nirnayakam
Filmfare Awards South
 2013 Best Film – Ayalum Njanum Thammil
Padmarajan Memorial Award
 2013 Chalachitra Prathiba
 Henko Flowers Indian Film Awards
2016 – Best Supporting Actor – Nirnnayakam

Kerala State Television Awards
 2001 Best Actor – Avasthantharangal
 2004 Best Actor – Avicharitham
 2004 Best Tele Serial – Avicharitham
 2009 Best Tele Serial – Aagneyam (Tele Serial)
 2015 2nd Best Actor – Iswaran Saakshiyayi
Minnale Film & TV Awards
 2014 Best Actor – Oru Penninte Katha & Aakaashadoothu

Filmography

As an actor 

 Aranaazhikaneram (1970)
 Panitheeraatha Veedu (1973) as Hari
 Udayam (1973)
 Thottavadi (1973) as Babu
 Suprabhatham (1974)
 Chattakkaari (1974)
 Shapamoksham (1974)
 Seemantha Puthran (1976)
 Aaraadhana (1977)
 Aval Oru Devaalayam (1977)
 Rappadikalude Gatha(1978)
 Eeta (1978)
 Kallan Pavithran (1981)
 Oridathoru Phayalvaan (1981)
 Idavela (1982)
 Koodevide (1983)
 Prathijnja (1983) as Police Officer
 Ente Kaanakkuyil (1985)
 Onnaanaam Kunnil Oradikkunnil (1985)
 Ee Kaikalil (1986)
 Kariyilakkaattu Pole (1986)
 Season (1989)
 Orukkam (1990)
 Johnnie Walker (1992)
 Aakashadoothu (1993)
 Maayaamayooram (1993)
 Puthran(1994) as Avarachan
 Highway (1995)
 Vamsam (1997)
 Niram (1999)
 Ente Veedu Appoontem (2003)
 CI Mahadedvan 5 Adi 4 Anchu (2004)
 Kusruthi (2004)
 The Campus (2005)
 Chinthamani Kolacase (2006)
 Raashtram (2006)
 Balram vs Tharadas (2006)
 Moonnamathoral (2006)
 [[Notebook (2006 film)|Notebook]] (2006)
 [[Detective (2007 film)|Detective]] (2007)
 Ividam Swargamaanu (2009)
 [[Four Friends (2010 film)|Four Friends]] (2010)
 Marykkundoru Kunjaadu (2010)
 [[Traffic (2011 film)|Traffic]] (2011)
 Ee Adutha Kaalathu (2012)
 Ustad Hotel (2012)
 Ayalum Njanum Thammil (2012)
 Kadal Kadannu Oru Mathukkutty (2013)
 Moonam Naal Njayarazhcha
 [[London Bridge (film)|London Bridge]] (2014)
 [[How Old Are You? (film)|How Old Are You]] (2014)
 [[Avatharam (2014 Malayalam film)|Avatharam]] (2014)
 [[Angels (2014 film)|Angels]] (2014)
 Nirnayakam (2015)
 Vettah (2016)
 [[Take Off (2017 film)|Take Off]] (2017)
 Samaksham (2018)
 Joseph (2018)
 Ira (2018)
 Marconi Mathai (2019)
 Valiya Perunnal (2019)
 Evide (2019)
 Uyare (2019)
 Brother's Day (2019)
 Al mallu (2020)
 Kaanekkaane (2021)
 Enthada Saji (2022)

As a producer 

 Peruvazhiyambalam (1979)
 Koodevide (1983)
 Parannu Parannu Parannu (1984)
 Ente Kaanakkuyil (1985)
 Kunjattakilikal (1986)
 Ee Kaikalil (1986)
 Orukkam (1990)
 Johnnie Walker (1992)
 Akashadoothu (1993)
 Puthran (1994)
 Highway (1995)
 Dilliwala Rajakumaran (1996)
 Nee Varuvolam (1997)
 Meenathil Thalikettu (1998)
 Njangal Santhushtaranu (1999)
 Ente Veedu Appoontem (2003)
 Sankaranum Mohananum (2011)
 Ayalum Njanum Thammil (2012)
 Evidey (2019)

As playback singer 
 Kaarthika Nakshathrathe as Kaarthika (1968)

Television career

Books 
Prakashavarshangal (Autobiography)

References

External links 
 
 Prem Prakash at MSI

Male actors from Kochi
Male actors in Malayalam cinema
Living people
1943 births
Male actors in Malayalam television
20th-century Indian male actors
21st-century Indian male actors
Indian male television actors
Indian male film actors
Malayalam film producers